Dashli (also Romanized as Dāshlī) is a village in Abish Ahmad Rural District, Abish Ahmad District, Kaleybar County, East Azerbaijan Province, Iran. At the 2006 census, its population was 15, in 4 families.

References 

Populated places in Kaleybar County